The Swiss Forest or Switzerland Forest is a forest area on the western side of the Sea of Galilee in Israel, situated above the city of Tiberias.

The forest was established in 1928 by the Forestry Branch of the Mandatory Palestine government thanks to a contribution from friends of Keren Kayemeth LeIsrael-Jewish National Fund in Switzerland, which is how it got its name. The forest was established to prevent flooding such as in the Great Flood of 1934 when mud and torrential floods destroyed property and caused a number of deaths in Tiberias. It continues under the direction of KKL-JNF.

References

Forests of Israel
Tiberias
1928 establishments in Mandatory Palestine